Muara Teweh (abbreviated: MTW) is the regency seat of North Barito Regency and also one of the towns in Central Kalimantan. This town is at a distance of 350 km northeast of Palangka Raya city, the capital of Central Kalimantan Province. This town is situated mainly in 2 sub-districts i.e. the sub-district of Lanjas and the sub-district of Melayu located in the district of Central Teweh. The population of this town is roughly 46,652 people as of 2021.

Geography & Climate
To be precise, Muara Teweh is located at 0.95348 South and 114.89807 East. This town is located to the northeast of Palangka Raya, the capital of Central Kalimantan with the distance about 353 km. The total area of this town is around 221.17 km² which makes it roughly 2.67% of the total area of North Barito Regency. Muara Teweh is crossed by the Barito River as it is one of the towns located in the Barito River basin. This town is situated on the flatlands of northeastern Central Kalimantan within the Barito River basin area with the altitude being 35 metres above sea level. This town consists of two sub-districts in Teweh Tengah district i.e. the sub-district of Melayu and the sub-district of Lanjas.

As any other town in Central Kalimantan and due to its proximity to the equator, Muara Teweh has a tropical rainforest climate (Af) with heavy rainfall almost all year round, constant humidity and warm-to-hot temperature above 21°C.

Demographics 
As of 2021, the total population of Muara Teweh is about 46,652 inhabitants which represents 79.42% of the population of Teweh Tengah district and 29.7% of the entire population of North Barito Regency. The population density of this town is approximately 422 people/km². This town has 14,655 households and the average household size of this town is 3.18 people. The sex ratio of Muara Teweh is 102 which means there are 102 males to every 100 females.

Education 
As of 2021, Muara Teweh currently has 24 primary schools (19 public schools and five private schools), eight middle schools (five public schools and three private schools), three high schools (all public schools), two public vocational schools, one economic college, one polytechnic college, and one Islamic college.

Facilities 
For healthcare facility, Muara Teweh currently has one general hospital, three polyclinics, two public health centres, and fifteen pharmacies. For economic & trade facility, this town recently has ten shopping complexes, seven markets, ten minimarkets, 712 convenience stores, fifty restaurants, 158 food stalls/cafes, six hotels, and nineteen inns. For religious facility, Muara Teweh has 76 Islamic religious facilities, eleven Protestant churches, and two Catholic churches, one Kaharingan temple, and one Buddhist temple. This town is also served by the Beringin Airport located within the town precisely at the sub-district of Melayu.

References

Populated places in Central Kalimantan
Regency seats of Central Kalimantan
North Barito Regency